The northern cardinal (Cardinalis cardinalis) is a bird in the genus Cardinalis; it is also known colloquially as the redbird, common cardinal, red cardinal, or just cardinal (which was its name prior to 1985). It can be found in southeastern Canada, through the eastern United States from Maine to Minnesota to Texas, New Mexico, southern Arizona, southern California, and south through Mexico, Belize, and Guatemala. It is also an introduced species in a few locations such as Bermuda and Hawaii. Its habitat includes woodlands, gardens, shrublands, and wetlands.

It has a distinctive crest on the head and a mask on the face which is black in the male and gray in the female. The male is a vibrant red, while the female is a reddish olive color. The northern cardinal is mainly granivorous, but also feeds on insects and fruit. The male behaves territorially, marking out his territory with song. During courtship, the male feeds seeds to the female beak-to-beak. A clutch of three to four eggs is laid, and two to four clutches are produced each year. It was once prized as a pet, but its sale as a cage bird was banned in the United States by the Migratory Bird Treaty Act of 1918.

Taxonomy
The northern cardinal is one of three birds in the genus Cardinalis and is included in the family Cardinalidae, which is made up of passerine birds found in North and South America. The northern cardinal was one of the many species originally described by Carl Linnaeus in his landmark 1758 10th edition of Systema Naturae. It was initially included in the genus Loxia (as Loxia cardinalis), which now contains only crossbills. In 1838, it was placed in the genus Cardinalis and given the scientific name Cardinalis virginianus, which means "Virginia cardinal". In 1918, the scientific name was changed to Richmondena cardinalis to honor Charles Wallace Richmond, an American ornithologist. In 1983, the scientific name was changed again to Cardinalis cardinalis and the common name was changed to "northern cardinal", to avoid confusion with the several other species also termed cardinals.

The common name, as well as the scientific name, of the northern cardinal refers to the cardinals of the Roman Catholic Church, who wear distinctive red robes and caps. The term "northern" in the common name refers to its range, as it is the northernmost cardinal species.

Subspecies 
There are 19 subspecies:

 C. c. cardinalis (Linnaeus, 1758)
 C. c. affinis Nelson, 1899
 C. c. canicaudus Chapman, 1891
 C. c. carneus (Lesson, 1842)
 C. c. clintoni (Banks, 1963)
 C. c. coccineus Ridgway, 1873
 C. c. flammiger J.L. Peters, 1913
 C. c. floridanus Ridgway, 1896
 C. c. igneus S.F. Baird, 1860
 C. c. littoralis Nelson, 1897
 C. c. magnirostris Bangs, 1903
 C. c. mariae Nelson, 1898
 C. c. phillipsi Parkes, 1997
 C. c. saturatus Ridgway, 1885
 C. c. seftoni (Huey, 1940)
 C. c. sinaloensis Nelson, 1899
 C. c. superbus Ridgway, 1885
 C. c. townsendi (van Rossem, 1932)
 C. c. yucatanicus Ridgway, 1887

Description

The male averages slightly larger than the female. The adult male is a brilliant crimson red color with a black face mask over the eyes, extending to the upper chest. The color becomes duller and darker on the back and wings. The female is fawn-colored, with mostly grayish-brown tones and a slight reddish tint on the wings, crest, and tail feathers. The face mask of the female is gray to black and is less defined than that of the male. Both sexes possess prominent raised crests and bright coral-colored beaks. The beak is cone-shaped and strong. Young birds, both male and female, show coloring similar to the adult female until the fall, when they molt and grow adult feathers. They are brown above and red-brown below, with brick-colored crest, forehead, wings, and tail. The legs and feet are a dark pink-brown. The iris of the eye is brown.
The plumage color of the males is produced from carotenoid pigments in the diet. Coloration is produced from both red pigments and yellow carotenoid pigments. Northern cardinal males normally metabolize carotenoid pigments to create plumage pigmentation of a color different from the ingested pigment. When fed only yellow pigments, males become a pale red color. A few "yellow morph" cardinals, a trait called xanthochroism, lack the enzyme to do this conversion. Their beak and feathers (except for black face mask) are yellow. Sightings are rare.

During winter, both males and females will fluff up their down feathers in order to retain warm air next to their body. The down feathers are small and hairlike at the base of each flight feather. The legs and feet of almost all birds are thin and lack feathers, and are vulnerable to rapid heat loss.

In lower temperatures, they resort to more drastic measures which require even more energy expenditure. These techniques include shivering and adjusting their body temperature. Many wild birds, including northern cardinals, will shiver to stay warm. They tense their muscles, especially breast muscles, to generate heat. Cardinals have the ability to drop their body temperature 3 to 6° if needed. In dire conditions, they resort to dropping their temperature in order to survive.

Distribution and habitat
Northern cardinals are numerous across the eastern United States from the southern half of Maine to Minnesota to the Texas-Mexico border and in Canada in the southern portions of Ontario, Quebec, New Brunswick and Nova Scotia, all the way east to Cape Breton Island. Its range also extends south through Mexico to the Isthmus of Tehuantepec, northern Guatemala, and northern Belize. An allopatric population is found on the Pacific slope of Mexico from Jalisco to Oaxaca; note that this population is not shown on the range map. The species was introduced to Bermuda in 1700. It has also been introduced in Hawaii, southern California and southern Arizona. Its natural habitat is in woodlands, gardens, shrublands, and wetlands.

Ecology

Song and call

The northern cardinal is a territorial song bird. The male sings in a loud, clear whistle from the top of a tree or another high location to defend his territory. He will chase off other males entering his territory. He may mistake his image on various reflective surfaces as an invading male, and will fight his reflection relentlessly. The northern cardinal learns its songs, and as a result the songs vary regionally.  Mated pairs often travel together. Also, the songs of a northern cardinal will usually overlap more in syllables when compared to other northern cardinals near it than those far away from it.

Both sexes sing clear, whistled song patterns, which are repeated several times, then varied. Some common phrases are described as "cheeeer-a-dote, cheeer-a-dote-dote-dote", "purdy, purdy, purdy...whoit, whoit, whoit, whoit", "what-cheer, what-cheer... wheet, wheet, wheet, wheet" and "cheer, cheer, cheer, what, what, what, what". The northern cardinal has a distinctive alarm call, a short metallic chip sound. This call often is given when predators approach the nest, in order to give warning to the female and nestlings. 

The songs of the two sexes of the northern cardinal, although not distinguishable by the human ear, are sexually dimorphic. It is suggested that this is because of the differences in levels of hormones of the two sexes.

Predators
Northern cardinals are preyed upon by a wide variety of predators native to North America, including falcons, all Accipiter hawks, shrikes, bald eagles, golden eagles and several owls, including long-eared owls, and eastern screech owls. Predators of chicks and eggs include milk snakes, coluber constrictors, blue jays, crows, eastern gray squirrels, fox squirrels, eastern chipmunks, and domestic cats.

Diet
The diet of the northern cardinal consists mainly (up to 90%) of weed seeds, grains, and fruits. It is a ground feeder and finds food while hopping on the ground through trees or shrubbery. It will also consume snails and insects, including beetles, cicadas, and grasshoppers; it feeds its young almost exclusively on insects. Other common items include corn (maize) and oats, sunflower seeds, the blossoms and bark of elm trees, and drinks of maple sap from holes made by sapsuckers, an example of commensalism.

Reproduction 
Pairs may mate for successive years, but some also 'divorce' between seasons or choose a new mate when one dies. Pairs generally stay together year-round but are not necessarily monogamous. DNA studies of two populations of cardinals found that between 9 and 35% of nestlings were not fathered by the female's mate. Mated pairs sometimes sing together before nesting. During courtship they may also participate in a bonding behavior where the male collects food and brings it to the female, feeding her beak-to-beak.

Males sometimes bring nest material to the female, who does most of the building. She crushes twigs with her beak until they are pliable, then turns in the nest to bend the twigs around her body and push them into a cup shape with her feet. The cup has four layers: coarse twigs (and sometimes bits of trash) covered in a leafy mat, then lined with grapevine bark and finally grasses, stems, rootlets, and pine needles. Cardinals do not usually use their nests more than once. The nest is made of thin twigs, bark strips, and grasses, lined with grasses or other plant fibers. Eggs are laid one to six days following the completion of the nest. The eggs are white, with a tint of green, blue or brown, and are marked with lavender, gray, or brown blotches which are thicker around the larger end. The shell is smooth and slightly glossy. Three or four eggs are laid in each clutch. The female generally incubates the eggs, though, rarely, the male will incubate for brief periods of time. Incubation takes 12 to 13 days. Young fledge 10 to 11 days after hatching. Two or three, and even four, broods are raised each year. The male cares for and feeds each brood as the female incubates the next clutch of eggs.

The oldest wild cardinal banded by researchers lived at least 15 years and 9 months, although 28.5 years was achieved by a captive bird. Annual survival rates for adult northern cardinals have been estimated at 60 to 65%.

Relationship with humans
The northern cardinal is found in residential areas throughout its range. Backyard birders attract it using feeders containing seeds, particularly sunflower seeds and safflower seeds. Although some controversy surrounds bird feeding, an increase in backyard feeding by humans has generally been beneficial to this species. Populations appear to remain stable and not threatened to reach the threshold of inclusion as a threatened species, which requires a decline of more than 30% in ten years or three generations. It was once prized as a pet due to its bright color and distinctive song. In the United States, this species receives special legal protection under the Migratory Bird Treaty Act of 1918, which also banned their sale as cage birds. It is also protected by the Convention for the Protection of Migratory Birds in Canada. It is illegal to take, kill, or possess northern cardinals, and violation of the law is punishable by a fine of up to US$15,000 and imprisonment of up to six months.

In the United States, the northern cardinal  (referred to as just "cardinal") is the mascot of numerous athletic teams; however, most teams portray the bird with a yellow beak and legs. In professional sports, it is the mascot of the St. Louis Cardinals of Major League Baseball's National League and the Arizona Cardinals of the National Football League, which for many years were also based in St. Louis. In college athletics, it is the mascot of many schools including Ball State University, The Catholic University of America, Illinois State University, the University of the Incarnate Word, Lamar University, the University of Louisville, the Massachusetts College of Pharmacy and Health Sciences, North Idaho College, Otterbein University, Saint John Fisher College, the State University of New York at Plattsburgh, Wesleyan University, Wheeling University, and William Jewell College.

A study conducted in 2016 in Atlanta, Georgia, on West Nile virus transmission in the United States, found that unlike other species, northern cardinals biologically suppress the disease upon infection.

U.S. state bird

The northern cardinal is the state bird of seven U.S. states, more than any other species: Illinois, Indiana, Kentucky, North Carolina, Ohio, Virginia, and West Virginia; although in each case the particular state just refers to the bird as "cardinal". It was also a candidate to become the state bird of Delaware, but lost to the Delaware Blue Hen.

References

External links

Article on cardinal's songs from Columbia University

Cardinal stamps at bird-stamps.org
Florida bird sounds, including the northern cardinal - Florida Museum of Natural History

northern cardinal
Native birds of Eastern Canada
Native birds of the Eastern United States
Birds of the United States
Birds of Mexico
northern cardinal
Symbols of Illinois
northern cardinal
Symbols of Indiana
Symbols of Kentucky
Symbols of North Carolina
Symbols of Ohio
Symbols of Virginia
Symbols of West Virginia